Altes Geld (German: Old Money) is an Austrian TV dark comedy series created by David Schalko, revolving around the dysfunctions of a wealthy Viennese family.

Plot 

When Rolf Rauchensteiner, patriarch of a rich Viennese dynasty, discovers that he will die soon unless he receives a new liver, he decides that his inheritance will go to whoever finds him a new liver. This creates havoc in the dysfunctional family, as everyone scrambles to find a liver and the head doctor who could help him refuses to do so. There are also other issues, since his wife Liane is having affairs with both her stepson Zeno and the family doctor, his Jewish sister decides to sue for restitution and his daughter Jana is infatuated with his son Jakob. Over the course of the eight episodes, other storylines develop such as Jakob's girlfriend Kerstin being arrested for murder, Zeno gambling his wealth away and Rolf's assistant Brunner losing the trust of his wife Barbara.

Main Cast
Udo Kier as Rolf Rauchensteiner, billionaire industrialist
Sunnyi Melles as Liane Rauchensteiner, Rauchensteiner's second wife
Nicholas Ofczarek as  Zeno Rauchensteiner, Rauchensteiner's son from his first marriage
Manuel Rubey as Jakob Rauchensteiner, Rolf and Liane Rauchensteiner's son
Nora Waldstätten as Jana Rauchensteiner, Rolf and Liane Rauchensteiner's Daughter
Edita Malovčić as Tania, Zeno's girlfriend
Thomas Stipsits as Herwig Brunner, Rolf Rauchensteiner's assistant
Ursula Strauss as Barbara Brunner, Herwig Brunner's wife
Robert Palfrader as Kralicek, Rolf Rauchensteiner's security
Yohanna Schwertfeger as Kerstin Bachmann, Jakob Rauchensteiner's girlfriend
Simon Schwarz as Tscheppe, Head of the organ distribution office, Green party politician
Cornelius Obonya as  Dr. Schober, Rauchensteiner family doctor
Florian Teichtmeister as Martin, Jana Rauchensteiner's friend
Johannes Krisch as the Commander
Maria Hofstätter as the Commander's wife

Background and production

Altes Geld was originally broadcast on Flimmit, ORF's online platform in early 2015, before being aired on ORF eins in Austria in November. Subsequently, it aired on RTL Crime in Germany in February 2016. It also screened at the International Film Festival Rotterdam in 2016. 

The main role of Rolf Rauchensteiner was played by Udo Kier. It was originally supposed to be acted by Gert Voss, before his sudden death. Like Voss, most of the other actors were from the Burgtheater in Vienna.

Episodes

Reception

Screen Anarchy reviewed the series after it played at the International Film Festival Rotterdam, saying "Altes Geld is a caustic satire, a hilarious thriller, and a spectacularly sadistic soap all in one". The Guardian said "the deadpan style recalls the work of Yorgos Lanthimos". For Wunschliste the series was fascinating but the unlikeable characters made it hard to watch.

Altes Geld won a silver medal at the New York TV and Film Awards and a Gold Panda at the Sichuan Television Festival.

References

External links
 
 Altes Geld at fernsehserien.de

2015 Austrian television series debuts
ORF (broadcaster) original programming
2010s Austrian television series
Television shows set in Vienna
Vienna in fiction